Loftusiida is an order of foraminifers in the class Globothalamea.

Subtaxa 
Suborder Ataxophragmiina
 Superfamily Ataxophragmioidea
 Family Ataxophragmiidae
 Family †Cuneolinidae
 Family Dictyopsellidae
 Family Dicyclinidae
 Family Globotextulariidae
 Family Montsaleviidae
 Family Textulariellidae

Suborder Biokovinina
 Superfamily Biokovinoidea (Biokovinacea)
 Family Biokovinidae
 Family Charentiidae
 Family Lituoliporidae
 Superfamily Coscinophragmatoidea
 Family Coscinophragmatidae
 Family Haddoniidae

Suborder Cyclolinina
 Superfamily Cyclolinoidea
 Family Cyclolinidae

Suborder Loftusiina
 Superfamily Haplophragmioidea
 Family Cribratinidae
 Family Haplophragmiidae
 Family Labyrinthidomatidae
 Superfamily Loftusioidea (Loftusiacea)
 Family Cyclamminidae
 Family Ecougellidae
 Family Everticyclamminidae
 Family Hottingeritidae
 Family Loftusiidae
 Family Mesoendothyridae
 Family Spirocyclinidae
 Family Syrianidae

Suborder Orbitolinina
 Superfamily Coskinolinoidea
 Family Coskinolinidae
 Superfamily Orbitolinoidea
 Family Orbitolinidae
 Superfamily Pfenderinoidea
 Family Hauraniidae
 Family Parurgoninidae
 Family Pfenderinidae

References 

 On the heterogeneity of the former Textulariina (Foraminifera). VI Mikhalevich, Proceedings of the Sixth International Workshop on …, 2004

External links 
 
 
 Loftusiida at the World Foraminifera Database

 
Foraminifera orders
Taxa described in 2000